Charles Henry Berry (September 12, 1823 – August 21, 1900) was the first Minnesota Attorney General after statehood, from 1858 to 1860. He also served in the Minnesota Senate 1874–1876.

Born in Westerly, Rhode Island, Berry was educated in Caton, New York and was admitted to the New York Bar. In 1855, he moved to Winona, Minnesota, where he served on the local school board and was instrumental in establishing the state's first teachers' college, which is known today as Winona State University. In 1888, President Grover Cleveland appointed Berry as a territorial judge in Idaho Territory. He served as a territorial judge until Idaho was admitted to the union in 1890.

Notes

1823 births
1900 deaths
People from Westerly, Rhode Island
People from Winona, Minnesota
Minnesota lawyers
Minnesota state senators
Minnesota Attorneys General
Idaho Territory judges
New York (state) lawyers
Winona State University
19th-century American politicians
19th-century American judges
19th-century American lawyers